Saint Patrick Parish may refer to:

Saint Patrick Parish, Dominica
Saint Patrick Parish, Grenada
Saint Patrick Parish, Saint Vincent and the Grenadines
Saint Patrick Parish, Tobago

Civil parishes in the Caribbean
Parish name disambiguation pages